The Saint-Nicolas-de-Campagnac Bridge (French Pont Saint-Nicolas-de-Campagnac) is an arch bridge crossing the river Gardon near Sainte-Anastasie, in the southern French department of Gard.

The bridge was built between 1245 and 1260.

It is crossed by departmental route 979 ((D 979) from Nîmes to Uzès.

See also
List of medieval bridges in France

External links

 
 Webpage about the bridge (in French)

Bridges in France
Buildings and structures completed in 1260
Buildings and structures in Gard
Transport in Occitania (administrative region)
Bridges completed in the 13th century